Burry's is a food manufacturer, founded as Burry's Biscuit Corporation by George W. Burry in 1888 in Elizabeth, New Jersey, as a division of the Quaker Oats Company. The company was one of the manufacturers of Girl Scout cookies from 1936 until 1989.

History

Burry's Biscuit Corporation
Burry Biscuit dates to 1888, when Christina Burry began manufacturing cookies in Toronto. The company was organised by George W. Burry into the Burry Biscuit Corporation in 1933, based in Chicago. In 1938 the company was called Burry's Biscuit Corporation. That year it moved to Elizabeth, New Jersey. It manufactured Girl Scout Cookies, which it called Plantation cookies. The cookies were packed in a sealed cardboard cylinder, and later the cookies were packed in cans. The company began manufacturing Girl Scout cookies in 1936.

In 1944, Burry's manufactured Girl Scout Cookies including "Thin Mints", a sugared shortbread cookie called "Scot-Teas", and "Savannahs", an oatmeal sandwich cookie with peanut butter filling. 

In 1944, the Burry Biscuit expanded into cleaning and hygiene products. As of 1946, the company produced pretzels and pioneered a machine-made pretzel to automate the process. 

In 1950, Burry's Biscuit Corporation purchased Independent Biscuits Inc. of Davenport, Iowa for $125,000. Burry's continued to operate Independent Biscuits as a division of Burry's. On March 29, 1954, the company purchased LeRoy Foods, a Brooklyn-based food company. It also purchased Empire Biscuit around the same time. These two purchases doubled Burry's sales. Around 1960 Burry Biscuit purchased Cal-Ray Bakeries, a baking corporation based in the Western United States. In January 1962 the company became a division of Quaker Oats Company, in a takeover valued at around $25,000,000. At the time of purchase, Burry Biscuit had 1,600 employees, profits of around $730,000 on revenue of $22,525,874, and offered over 40 products. 

In 1962, Burry's was the largest producer of Girl Scout cookies in the nation. One of their marketing managers, J.R. McAllister Borie, is credited with popularizing the 'Thin Mint Cookie'. In 1980, the food division of Burry's was sold to Générale Biscuit and its name was changed to Burry-Lu, to reflect LU, Générale Biscuit's international brand. In 1985, Burry-Lu and the Salerno-Megowen Biscuit Company were merged, forming General Biscuit Brands. The new company produced 13,000 tons of food, and 30% of Girl Scout cookies.  In 1989, ABC Cookie Bakers purchased Burry's Girl Scout cookie division. In 1991, the rest of the company was purchased by Sunshine Biscuits.

Burry's Foods
The "Gaucho" peanut butter sandwich cookie produced by Burry was the same cookie as the Savannah, produced for the consumer market ; Gauchos came in a coarse cardstock box that was covered in a wax-coated paper label. These cookies had a small hole in the oatmeal wafer top that allowed any excess peanut butter filling to escape during production, thereby avoiding the filling being pushed out between the cookie layer sides.

A small retail store offered baked-that-day but broken/defective cookies in bulk for discounts.  A shopping-bag-size bag of thin mints cost $1.00.

The Scooter Pie consisted of two large round graham cracker cookies with a thick layer of marshmallow between and coated with chocolate, similar to the Moon Pie or choco pie.

Per Candy and Snack Industry it was a recognized leader in the cookie and cracker business.

They had a diverse list of products.  These included Burry's Tart and Entree Shells, Burry's Gourmet Crackers and Cookies, and Famous Euphrates Wafers and Shells, Burry's Vended Cookies and Snacks  The company claimed the "secret" of its process was "Slow baking".

See also
 List of bakery companies in the US
 List of baked goods
 List of food companies

References

Further reading
Elizabeth fire claims a storied building - NJ.com
Prominent Families of New Jersey

External links
 

Late 70's Television Commercial Video via YouTube

Brand name snack foods
Companies established in 1888
Snack food manufacturers of the United States
Manufacturing companies based in New Jersey
Food and drink companies based in Illinois
Food and drink companies established in 1888
American brands
Bakeries of the United States
Brand name breads
Brand name desserts
Bagel companies